Alan Leslie Barton (16 September 1953 – 23 March 1995) was a British singer and member of the hit-making duo Black Lace. Their hits included "Agadoo", "Superman" and their United Kingdom Eurovision Song Contest 1979 seventh-place finisher "Mary Ann" in Jerusalem.

Career
Born in Barnsley, Yorkshire, Barton replaced Chris Norman in Smokie in 1986, recording six albums with them, and touring extensively as their lead vocalist and rhythm guitarist. He was the lead singer on Smokie's revival of their hit, "Living Next Door to Alice", recorded with comedian Roy 'Chubby' Brown, as "Living Next Door to Alice (Who the F**k Is Alice)". In the early 1990s, he released his only solo album, Precious (1991) and two accompanying singles: "July 69" (1990) and "Carry Your Heart" (with Kristine Pettersen) (1991).

Barton died in March 1995, at the age of 41, from injuries incurred when Smokie's tour bus crashed during a hailstorm in Cologne, Germany.

He is buried at Liversedge cemetery, West Yorkshire.

References

External links
 Smokie.co.uk - feature articles about Smokie
 barton.adc.kz - official homepage about Alan Barton and his son Dean Barton

1953 births
1995 deaths
Eurovision Song Contest entrants for the United Kingdom
English male singers
English rock guitarists
English pop guitarists
English male guitarists
British soft rock musicians
Musicians from Barnsley
Road incident deaths in Germany
20th-century English singers
20th-century British guitarists
20th-century British male singers